Saitama Wild Knights (formerly Panasonic Wild Knights) is a Japanese rugby union team formerly based in Ōta city, Gunma prefecture which plays in the Top League. Inspired by Tony Brown at fly half (though he was not captain), it dominated the league in the fifth season and was the first team to be unbeaten throughout a Top League season. The team rebranded as Saitama Wild Knights ahead of the rebranding of the Top League to the Japan Rugby League One in 2022, with the team relocating to Saitama.

History

Early Years (1960 to 1975)

The Wild Knights were founded in 1960 by alumni of the Kumagai Industrial School and workers of the Tokyo Sanyo corporation. Initially an amateur company team, they competed in the Kantō Leagues during the 1960s, rising gradually through the ranks of the prefecture's rugby pyramid.

In 1968 they undertook the first tour in their history when they travelled to South Korea to face a number of university and company teams there. In 1971 they won their first ever Kantō Rugby Championship, after arising from the 4th division only 9 years earlier. This success was followed the next season with a successive championship title, a testament to the increasing fortunes of the Gunma club.

Growth and Success (1975 to 2002)

After a few runners-up places, the club won seven back-to-back titles between 1976 and 1982, becoming the dominant rugby force in Kantō-chihō. Further titles were added in 1986 and 1987, before the Wild Knights were entered into the new East Japan Rugby Championship against other top clubs from Kantō and Tōhoku. Rugby in Japan was a growing sport, gradually gaining popularity and competitiveness outside of its normal strongholds in company break-rooms and college campuses. Although still nominally amateur, the Wild Knights nonetheless used their position in the Tokyo Sanyo corporation to hire talented foreigners to 'work' for the company with the real intention of playing for the rugby team. Known as "shamateurism", it became rampant in rugby union, as well as football and baseball.

Due to the merger of Tokyo Sanyo Electric with Sanyo Electric in 1986, the team name was changed to Sanyo Electric Rugby Team. The maiden season of the new East Japan league was captured in 1988, with further crowns captured in 1990 and 1991. Further titles were nabbed during the 1990s and in May 1997 the club's new ground at Ryumai-cho was officially unveiled.

Early Top League Era (2003 to 2012)

In 2003 the Japan Rugby Football Union launched the Top League, Japan's first nationwide domestic rugby competition. Held annually between September and February, the Top League would mark a new future for the sport in Japan and a fully professional structure would help clubs like the Wild Knights to attract better players.

Immediately prior to the launch of the Top League in 2003, the club renamed the name to "Sanyo Wild Knights". In the maiden season of the Top League, the club finished in 7th but did manage to win the Fair Play Award for 2003–04. The league that year was won by the Kobe Kobelco Steelers. The Wild Knights fans were also awarded the Japan Special Award for their support and atmosphere. The club's starting scrum-half Wataru Ikeda was also chosen for the league Best XV that year.

The following season seemed to mirror the first, as the Wild Knights fans were again awarded the Special Award and the club finished in 7th. They exited the Microsoft Cup in the first round. 2006 saw them finish runners-up in the league and see team-members Tony Brown and Yamauchi Tomokazu selected for the league's Best XV.

In 2008, the club was crowned Top League champions, managing to go on a 13-game unbeaten record on their way to the title. The club won their second Top League crown in 2010 only to lose out in the playoffs. However, the club's success was mirrored in the fact that Naoki Kawamata, Shota Horie, Seiichi Shimomura, Tomonori Kitagawa and Atsushi Tatanabe selected in the league's Best XV. Fullback Atsushi Tatanabe was also crowned the league's top scorer and best kicker for 2009.

In 2011, despite finishing in 3rd during the regular league season, the club won the Championship play-offs by beating Suntory Sungoliath 28–23 in the final. Akihito Yamada was named MVP for the entire season. The club were runners-up in the play-offs in 2012.

Panasonic Wild Knights (2012 to 2021)
Prior to the start of the 2012–13 season, the club was sold to Panasonic corporation and renamed the Panasonic Wild Knights, the name they currently bear. The team colours were switched from red and black to predominantly blue and black.

In 2014, Head Coach Norifumi Nakajima left the club on the back of a historic double championship Top League and All-Japan Rugby Football Championship during the 2013–14 season. On 21 April 2014, it was confirmed that former Wallabies and Crusaders Head Coach Robbie Deans would become the new coach of Panasonic Wild Knights.

Honours
Top League winners: 2010, 2014, 2015, 2016, 2021
Japan Rugby League One winners: 2022
All-Japan Champions: 2008, 2011

Personnel

Coaching staff

Current squad

The Saitama Wild Knights squad for the 2023 season is:

 * denotes players qualified to play for the Japan on dual nationality or residency grounds.

Past

Epi Taione - Tongan Centre/Wing/Flanker who has played for Newcastle, Sale and more recently Super Rugby side 
Semi Taupeaafe - former Wallabies sevens, New South Wales Waratahs and Tongan international
Sinali Latu - now coach of Daito Bunka University R.F.C.
Murray Henderson - former Sanyo Wild Knights coach, Portugal National team forwards coach, current Oxford Uni OURFC Head Coach
Jaque Fourie - South African international centre
Sonny Bill Williams - former utility New Zealand international.
Tony Brown - Fly-half, New Zealand international
Daniel Heenan - Lock, Australian international
Mitsugu Yamamoto (2004-11, 102 games) Hooker, Japanese international (2004-07, 10 caps)
Koliniasi Holani (2006-19, 148 games) Loose Forward, Japanese international (2008-16, 45 caps)
Fumiaki Tanaka (2007-19, 157 games) Scrum-half, Japanese international (2008-, 75 caps)
Naoki Kawamata (2008-17, 133 games) Prop, Japanese international (2008-11, 18 caps)
Akihito Yamada (2010-19, 115 games) Winger, Japanese international (2013-18, 25 caps)

References

External links 
  (Japanese)
 Sanyo Wild Knights win 45th All-Japan Championship - JRFU English website

Japan Rugby League One teams
Rugby clubs established in 1960
Sports teams in Gunma Prefecture
Panasonic
1960 establishments in Japan